The blackish chat-tyrant (Ochthoeca nigrita) is a species of passerine bird in the tyrant flycatcher family. It is found in eastern Venezuela. Its natural habitats are subtropical or tropical moist montane forests and heavily degraded former forest.

The species was formerly treated as conspecific with the slaty-backed chat-tyrant (Ochthoeca cinnamomeiventris).

References

blackish chat-tyrant
Birds of the Northern Andes
blackish chat-tyrant
blackish chat-tyrant
blackish chat-tyrant